Elihu Spencer Miller (September 3, 1817 – March 6, 1879) was a Dean of the University of Pennsylvania Law School.

Biography
Miller was born in Princeton, New Jersey. He attended the College of New Jersey (since renamed as Princeton University), graduating in 1836. He trained as a lawyer in Princeton and Baltimore, Maryland. He passed the bar, and moved to Philadelphia, Pennsylvania, in 1843, setting up a practice.

In 1852 Miller was a professor of real estate, conveyancing, and equity at the University of Pennsylvania Law School. He was elected to the American Philosophical Society in 1857. During the Civil War he raised an independent company of Pennsylvania Militia Artillery ("Miller's Battery"), and served as its Captain from its muster in on June 19, 1863, until it was mustered out on July 25, 1863.

Miller was Dean of the University of Pennsylvania Law School from 1868 until he resigned in 1872 in line with his objection and opposition to the law school being moved to West Philadelphia. Miller died in Philadelphia on March 6, 1879.

References 

University of Pennsylvania Law School faculty
People from Princeton, New Jersey
Princeton University alumni
1817 births
1879 deaths
Deans of University of Pennsylvania Law School
Lawyers from Philadelphia
19th-century American lawyers
Scholars of property law